Emerillon may refer to:
Emerillon people, an indigenous people of French Guiana
Emerillon language, a Tupian language of French Guiana
, a ship used by Jacques Cartier
Emerillon (software), an OpenStreetMap viewer

Language and nationality disambiguation pages